The 2015–16 Saudi Second Division was the 20th season of the Saudi Second Division since its establishment in 1996.

The season featured 13 teams from the 2014–15 campaign, three new teams relegated from the 2014–15 First Division League: Al-Safa, Abha and Hetten, and four new teams promoted from the 2014–15 Saudi Third Division: Al Jabalain as champion and group A winner, Al-Qaisumah as runner-up and group B winner, Al-Washm as group B runner-up and Al-Qala as group A runner-up. The league began on 8 October 2015 and ended on 27 February 2016.

Al-Qaisumah won the league title after beating Al-Adalh 2–1 on aggregate in the final, both teams promoted to the 2016–17 Saudi First Division, also Wej promoted after defeating Al-Badaya 1–0 on aggregate in the third place play-off. While Al-Oyoon, Al-Akhdoud, Al-Tuhami and Al-Qala were relegated.

Teams
Teams relegated from the 2014–15 Saudi First Division
Al-Safa
Abha
Hetten

Teams promoted from the 2014–15 Saudi Third Division
Al Jabalain
Al-Qaisumah
Al-Washm
Al-Qala

;Group A

Group B

Group A
Table

Results

Group B
Table

Results

Third place play-off
Al-Badaya, who finished 2nd in group B faced Wej the 2nd of group A for a two-legged play-off to decide the third promotion team with Al-Adalh and Al-Qaisumah. Wej won 1–0 on aggregate and were promoted to the 2016–17 Saudi First Division.

First leg

Second leg

Wej won 1–0 on aggregate.

Final
The winners of each group played two-legged matches to decide champions of the 2015–16 Saudi Second Division. Al-Qaisumah won 2–1 on aggregate against Al-Adalh.

First leg

Second leg

Al-Qaisumah won 2–1 on aggregate.

Champions

See also
 2015–16 Professional League
 2015–16 1st Division League
 2016 King Cup
 2015–16 Crown Prince Cup
 2015 Super Cup

References

Saudi Second Division seasons
3